Adam Gruca (born 3 December 1893 in Majdan Sieniawski, died 3 June 1983 in Warsaw) was a famous Polish orthopaedist, inventor, and surgeon. He is considered to be the founder of modern orthopedic surgery in Poland. Gruca also invented various orthopaedic instruments and appliances.

References

External links
 

1893 births
1983 deaths
People from Przeworsk County
Polish orthopaedic surgeons
Polish Rifle Squads members
Recipients of the Order of the Banner of Work
Recipients of the Order of Polonia Restituta (1944–1989)
20th-century surgeons